"Untuk Negeri Kita" (Jawi: اونتوق نڬري كيت, ; "For Our State") is the state anthem of the Malaysian state of Penang. It was written by Penang born composer and jazz musician James W. Boyle. The anthem was subsequently played for the first time on 22 December 1972, during the birthday celebrations of the then Governor of Penang (Malay: Yang di-Pertua Negeri Pulau Pinang), Tun Syed Sheh Hassan Barakbah.

Originally played to a slower tempo, the state anthem of Penang was modified in 1993 to its current, faster pace. This particular move, announced by the then Chief Minister of Penang, Koh Tsu Koon, was said to reflect the enthusiasm and dynamism of Penang's citizens towards the state's progress.

Lyrics

Use 
At the start of all official functions held within the state of Penang, the state anthem of Penang must be played after the Malaysian national anthem, Negaraku. The state anthem must be sung according to the official Malay lyrics. The flag of Penang is also raised simultaneously with the singing of the state anthem. Every person present must stand at attention while singing the state anthem.

In addition, the state anthem is sung once a week in all national schools throughout Penang.

References

Notes

External links
 Penang State Anthem lyrics
 Penang state anthem at national-anthems.org
 The Anthem (Vocal)
 The Anthem (Instrumental)

Penang
Anthems of Malaysia
Asian anthems
Year of song unknown